Here Comes the Night may refer to:

 "Here Comes the Night", song written by Bert Berns, released by Them
 "Here Comes the Night" (The Beach Boys song), 1967
 "Here Comes the Night", a song by Destroyer, from the album This Night
 "Here Comes the Night", a song written by Doc Pomus and Mort Shuman, recorded by Ben E. King, The Walker Brothers and David Johansen among others
 Here Comes the Night (Barry Manilow album), and its title song, written by Barry Manilow and John Bettis 
 Here Comes the Night (David Johansen album), the third solo album for New York Dolls lead singer David Johansen and its title song, written by Johansen and Bill Chaplin
 "Here Comes the Night", a song by Chris Norman
 "Here Comes the Night", a single by Rare Earth (B-side of "Born to Wander", written by Tom Baird)
 "Here Comes the Night", a single by the Swedish singer Kim Fransson from his debut album Kim
 "Here Comes the Night", a song by Nick Gilder
 Here Comes the Night (radio show), a seven-year radio show run by Donal Dineen on Today FM
 "Here Comes the Night", a song by Henry Glover, recorded by Wynonie Harris on the album 'Battle of the Blues, Vol. 2 (1959 compilation; King Lp 627)'
 "Here Comes the Night", a song by Janis Ian for the film The Bell Jar (1979), included on her album Night Rains (1979)

See also
 "Here Comes the Knight", a song by Van Morrison from No Guru, No Method, No Teacher
"Here Come the Nice", a single by Small Faces